Robatumumab (proposed INN; also known as SCH 717454 and MK-7454) is a monoclonal antibody and an antineoplastic by Merck and Schering-Plough. It binds to CD221, the insulin-like growth factor 1 receptor.

Phase 2 clinical trials in patients with colorectal cancer, osteosarcoma and Ewing's sarcoma are complete. Merck has since discontinued development.

References 

Monoclonal antibodies
Experimental cancer drugs